Terry Mountain (born 7 July 1935) is a former Australian rules footballer who played with Melbourne and Geelong in the Victorian Football League (VFL).

Notes

External links 

1935 births
Australian rules footballers from Victoria (Australia)
Melbourne Football Club players
Geelong Football Club players
Living people